Cyttaranthus is a plant genus of the family Euphorbiaceae first described as a genus in 1955. It contains only one known species, Cyttaranthus congolensis, native to tropical Africa (Congo-Brazzaville, Congo-Kinshasa (Zaire), Gabon, Cabinda, Tanzania).

References

Agrostistachydeae
Monotypic Euphorbiaceae genera
Flora of West-Central Tropical Africa
Flora of Tanzania